Clifton High School may refer to:

United Kingdom 
Clifton High School, Bristol – Clifton, Bristol

United States 
Clifton High School (Clifton, New Jersey) – Clifton, New Jersey
Clifton High School (Clifton, Arizona) – Clifton, Arizona (closed September 2010)
Clifton Central High School – Clifton, Illinois
Lake Clifton Eastern High School – Baltimore, Maryland
Clifton High School (Clifton, Texas) – Clifton, Texas
Clifton Forge High School – a former high school in Clifton Forge, Virginia